The Millpond Plantation in Thomas County, Georgia near Thomasville was listed on the National Register of Historic Places in 1976.

Its present main house was built during 1903-1905 and the complex was completed in 1910;  its architects were noted Cleveland, Ohio architects Hubbell & Benes and landscape design was by Warren Manning. Its architecture is Mission/Spanish Revival.

References

Houses on the National Register of Historic Places in Georgia (U.S. state)
Mission Revival architecture in Georgia (U.S. state)
Houses completed in 1910
Houses in Thomas County, Georgia
National Register of Historic Places in Thomas County, Georgia
Plantations in Georgia (U.S. state)